On 3 April 2016, Abkhazia held local elections for the 6th convocations of its local assemblies in all districts except Gali.

Background
The terms of the 5th convocations had originally been set to expire in February 2015, but were extended on 17 December 2014 by the People's Assembly. On 3 February 2016, the People's Assembly extended elections in Gali District once again, until 12 February 2017, because of the unresolved passport situation.

Sukhumi
The election for Sukhumi City Council was contested by 82 candidates. Originally, 88 candidates had been nominated but three refused to stand as candidate. Of the remaining 85 candidates, twelve were nominated by United Abkhazia, one by the Abkhazian Railways and the rest by initiative groups. 18 were women. 14 of the candidates were incumbent deputies. All but one of the candidates were successfully registered. Two further candidates withdrew at a later date.

Results
Turnout was 14,718 out of 39,070 eligible voters (38%). The elections in constituencies no. 21 and 23 were declared invalid, as voter turnout was below 25%. Reruns in these constituencies were held on 29 May. One of the elected council members was a woman.

Gagra District
65 candidates were nominated in 25 constituencies, 6 of whom women. Preliminary turnout was 46%. One of the elected deputies was a woman and only four were incumbents.

The new assembly elected Astan Agrba as its chairman and Aleksandr Tsyshba as its deputy chairman.

Pitsunda
15 candidates were nominated in 9 constituencies, 1 of whom a woman, who was not elected.

Gudauta District
55 candidates were nominated in 29 constituencies, 6 of whom women. All candidates were nominated by initiative groups. Turnout was reported as 41.5% and 55%. One of the women was elected. Among the elected deputies was long time New Athos mayor Feliks Dauta, who declared that after 13 years as mayor he wanted try his hand at being a deputy.

The new council elected Roman Bazba as its chairman and Inal Tsveiba as its deputy chairman.

New Athos
13 candidates were nominated in 9 constituencies, 4 of whom women. Of the elected deputies, one was a woman.

The new assembly re-elected Ramaz Smyr as its chairman and Temur Otyrba as its deputy chairman.

Sukhumi District

28 candidates were nominated in 15 constituencies, 3 of whom women. The election in constituency no. 12 was declared invalid because turnout was less than 25%. Overall turnout was 42% out of 6611 registered voters. Of the elected deputies, one was a woman. All had been nominated by initiative groups.

The new assembly elected Zaur Sangulia as its chairman and Rudolf Tarba as its deputy chairman.

Gulripshi District
23 candidates were nominated in 16 constituencies, 4 of whom women. All candidates were nominated by initiative groups. Turnout was 4268 out of 11,099 registered voters (39.6%). Of the elected deputies, two were women. The election in constituency no. 7 was declared invalid because two additional ballots were found, it will be repeated on 29 May.

The new assembly re-elected Igor Mikvabia as its new chairman and Andronik Kondakchyan as its deputy chairman.

Ochamchira District
60 candidates were nominated in 32 constituencies, 7 of whom women. Turnout was reported as 54.4% and 55.5%. Among the elected deputies were 4 women and only about 10% were incumbents.

The new assembly elected Adgur Kvitsinia as its chairman and Omari Shat-ipa as its deputy chairman.

Tkvarcheli District
30 candidates were nominated in 15 constituencies, 5 of whom women. Turnout was 46.4%. The election in constituency no. 14 (Chkhortol) was declared invalid because the two highest scoring candidates had received the same number of votes. None of the 14 winning candidates were incumbents, 2 were women, 2 had been nominated by Amtsakhara and 12 by initiative groups.

The new Assembly elected Damir Gorzolia as its chairman and Melis Jinjolia as its deputy chairman.

References

2016
local